The County of Fitzroy is a county (a cadastral division) in Queensland, Australia.  Like all counties in Queensland, it is a non-functional administrative unit, that is used mainly for the purpose of registering land titles.

Fitzroy includes the eastern and central parts of the South Burnett Region and part of the former Shire of Kilkivan in the Gympie Region. It was named by the Surveyor-General of New South Wales in the 1850s after Charles Augustus FitzRoy, who served as the Governor of New South Wales from 1848 to 1855. The county was officially named and bounded by the Governor in Council on 7 March 1901 under the Land Act 1897. The county is unrelated to the Fitzroy River, which is centred on the County of Livingstone.

Parishes 
Fitzroy is divided into parishes, as listed below:

References

External links 

 
 
 

Fitzroy